Huamen Town is an urban town in and subdivision of Shuangfeng County, Hunan Province, People's Republic of China.

Administrative division
The town is divided into 59 villages and 1 community, the following areas: 
 
 Shuanglong Community
 Herui Village
 Chunshan Village
 Lijiang Village
 Yangmei Village
 Duanyan Village
 Shenhong Village
 Ouba Village
 Zhangshan Village
 Shanlin Village
 Fengzui Village
 Wayao Village
 Fucha Village
 Huanglong Village
 Longshan Village
 Changshan Village
 Huangshan Village
 Dashan Village
 Qiaoxin Village
 Hejian Village
 Renmin Village
 Minyi Village
 Qunxi Village
 Qinghua Village
 Xinmin Village
 Yinong Village
 Jianjiang Village
 Junshan Village
 Huamen Village
 Zhongping Village
 Qinghe Village
 Renhe Village
 Xingfu Village
 Hong'ai Village
 Zengjia Village
 Shizuilong Village
 Mingxing Village
 Chuqiao Village
 Xiashan Village
 Shiyu Village
 Guangqian Village
 Fujia Village
 Taizhou Village
 Zhujiang Village
 Changlian Village
 Shengli Village
 Pingtian Village
 Dawang Village
 Qingshan Village
 Qunlou Village
 Dongqiao Village
 Shuangquan Village
 Sheyi Village
 Zhoushangqiao Village
 Shanyuan Village
 Baotai Village
 Datuo Village
 Shilong Village
 Nanfang Village
 Daba Village

External links

Divisions of Shuangfeng County